Henry Thomas Simons (26 November 1887 – 26 August 1956), sometimes known as Tommy Simons, was an English professional footballer who played as a forward in the Football League for Fulham, Sheffield United, Clapton Orient and Norwich City.

Career statistics

References

1887 births
1956 deaths
Footballers from Hackney, London
English footballers
Association football inside forwards
Leyton Orient F.C. players
Tufnell Park F.C. players
Leyton F.C. players
Doncaster Rovers F.C. players
Sheffield United F.C. players
Halifax Town A.F.C. players
Merthyr Town F.C. players
Brentford F.C. players
Fulham F.C. players
Queens Park Rangers F.C. players
Norwich City F.C. players
Margate F.C. players
English Football League players
Southern Football League players
Luton Town F.C. players
Tottenham Hotspur F.C. wartime guest players